2017 Academy Awards may refer to:

 89th Academy Awards, the Academy Awards ceremony that took place in 2017, honoring the best in film for 2016
 90th Academy Awards, the Academy Awards ceremony that took place in 2018, honoring the best in film for 2017